Africa, the world's second-largest and second-most populous continent, spans across six different time zone offsets from Coordinated Universal Time (UTC): UTC−01:00 to UTC+04:00. As Africa straddles the equator and tropics, there is little change in daylight hours throughout the year and as such daylight saving time is currently observed in only one country, Morocco, however it was also previously observed in several other countries.

Before the wide adoption of standard time zones, local mean time was widely used in railway time for train timetables and telegraphic time for telegraphy. Local mean time is a solar time that corrects the variations of local apparent time by forming a uniform time scale at a specific longitude; for instance, Liberia observed UTC-0:44:30 instead of an approximate offset such as UTC-01:00. British Rhodesia (at the time administered by the private British South Africa Company) was the first area in Africa to adopt standard time, switching to UTC+02:30 on 1 August 1899 as the previous time standards proved problematic for the railway system. Other countries followed suit, and by 1912, most Portuguese, French and British territories had adopted a standard offset. Liberia was the last country in Africa to adopt a standard offset, doing so on 7 January 1972.

Names for the offsets vary by country and jurisdiction: in Africa, UTC+01:00 is commonly known as "West Africa Time", however Algeria, Morocco and Tunisia designate the offset by its European name, "Central European Time"; UTC+02:00 – commonly known as "Central Africa Time" – is designated as "South African Standard Time" by Eswatini, Lesotho and South Africa, whilst Egypt and Libya designate it by its European name "Eastern European Time". Cape Verde is the only country in Africa which observes UTC-01:00, where it is known as Cape Verde Time (CVT); thirteen countries observe UTC±00:00, fourteen observe UTC+01:00, sixteen observe UTC+02:00, nine observe UTC+03:00, and two (Mauritius and Seychelles) observe UTC+04:00, where the offset is designated as Mauritius Time (MUT) and Seychelles Time (SCT) respectively.

History 
Before the wide adoption of standard time zones, local mean time, which is a solar time that corrects the variations of local apparent time by forming a uniform time scale at a specific longitude, such as railway time for train timetables and telegraphic time for telegraphy, was widely used. Due to the large size of the British company rule in Rhodesia, it meant Rhodesia observed three standards of time: UTC+01:30, +2:15 and +2:30; this was problematic for the railway system, so on 1 August 1899 the standard time zones UTC+02:30 was adopted nationwide, consequently resulting in this being the first standard time in Africa. This would soon be followed by Egypt, which adopted standard time on 1 October 1900; Nigeria adopted standard time on 1 July 1905, Seychelles in 1906, Mauritius on 1 January 1907, Togo in 1907, Algeria on 11 March 1911 and Tunisia on 12 April 1911. Most Portuguese territories (including Cape Verde and Mozambique) adopted standard time on 26 May 1911, followed by most remaining French and British territories on 1 July 1911 and 1 January 1912. The Gambia adopted standard time in 1918. Liberia was the last country in Africa to adopt a standard offset, doing so on 7 January 1972. The latest time change was South Sudan, which switched from UTC+3 to +2 on 1 February 2021.

Daylight saving time 

As Africa straddles the equator and tropics, there is little change in daylight hours throughout the year and as such daylight saving time (DST) is currently observed in only one country, Morocco, however it was also previously observed in several other countries: the countries that formerly observed DST are South Africa, which last observed it in 1944, Cape Verde in 1945, Madagascar in 1954, Ghana in 1956, Sierra Leone in 1962, Algeria and Chad in 1980, Sudan in 1985, Tunisia in 2008, Mauritius in 2009, Libya in 2012, Egypt in 2015, and Namibia in 2017. Since 2019, Morocco has observed UTC+01:00 year round except during the month of Ramadan, when it switches to UTC±00:00 as to not interfere with the month's fasting (sawm).

Time zones

See also 

African time–a perceived cultural tendency in parts of Africa and the Caribbean toward a more relaxed attitude to time
Daylight saving time in Africa
Date and time notation in Africa
Lists of time zones
Geography of Africa

Notes

References

General 
  
Shanks, Thomas G. (1985) "The International Atlas: World Longitudes and Latitudes Time Changes and Time Zones". ACS Publications. . Retrieved 6 September 2021.

Inline

External links 
Time zone abbreviations in Africa at TimeAndDate.com
Current local time in Africa at WorldTimeZone
Standard Time Zone chart of the World in 1920 (and other years) at WorldTimeZone.com

 
Africa